Zwierzyn  (formerly German Neu Mecklenburg) is a village in Strzelce-Drezdenko County, Lubusz Voivodeship, in western Poland. It is the head of the gmina (administrative district) called Gmina Zwierzyn.

According to Narodowy Instytut Dziedzictwa (governmental institution responsible for the objects considered most important to the nation's cultural heritage) there is one monument in Zwierzyn, John the Baptist Roman-Catholic Church, which was built in 1767.

In 2015 a new railway station was erected in Zwierzyn.

The village has a population of 1,300.

References

Villages in Strzelce-Drezdenko County